Belmokhtar is a surname. Notable people with the surname include:

Abdelkader Belmokhtar (born 1987), Algerian cyclist
Mokhtar Belmokhtar (born 1972),  Algerian sentenced to death for murder and terrorism
Said Belmokhtar (born 1984), Kazakhstani-born Ukrainian footballer of Algerian descent